Cae-y-Castell (currently known as the Essity Stadium for sponsorship reasons) is a football stadium in Flint, Flintshire, Wales. Located on the banks of the Dee Estuary close to Flint Castle, it is the home ground of Flint Town United and is also used by Flint Rugby Club.

History
The stadium was opened in 1993 after Flint moved from their previous Holywell Road ground.

In 2006–07, Connah's Quay Nomads were tenants at the ground.

In 2019, the stadium was renamed The Essity Stadium as part of a deal with the club's main sponsors.

In 2022, the club announced that an artificial pitch would be installed at the stadium. Later that year, Halkyn & Flint Mountain F.C. (now Flint Mountain F.C.) announced they had agreed to use the ground. The new pitch was installed in September 2022.

Proposed renovation
In 2019, Flint Town United and Connah's Quay Nomads began exploring a groundshare agreement which would see the stadium upgraded to UEFA Category 2, allowing it to host European qualifiers for both clubs as well as youth international fixtures.

References

Football venues in Wales
Flint, Flintshire